Auriscalpium luteolum is a species of fungus in the family Auriscalpiaceae of the Russulales order. First described as Hydnum luteolum by Elias Magnus Fries in 1874, it was transferred to the genus Auriscalpium by Petter Karsten in 1879.

References

External links

Fungi described in 1874
Fungi of Europe
Russulales
Taxa named by Elias Magnus Fries